René Daubinet (born 7 January 1933) is a French water polo player. He competed in the men's tournament at the 1960 Summer Olympics.

References

1933 births
Living people
French male water polo players
Olympic water polo players of France
Water polo players at the 1960 Summer Olympics
Sportspeople from Strasbourg